Game Pass may refer to:
 Xbox Game Pass
 NFL Game Pass
 GamePass, a subscription service from GameHouse
 Game Pass (Colorado), a mountain pass in Larimer County, Colorado, United States.
 Game Pass (Montana), a mountain pass in Granite County, Montana, United States.

See also
 Season pass (video gaming)
 Battle pass